John Ream Curtis (born May 10, 1960) is an American politician serving as the U.S. representative for Utah's 3rd congressional district since 2017. A Republican who served as mayor of Provo, Utah, from 2010 to 2017. On November 7, 2017, he won a special election to replace Jason Chaffetz in Congress after Chaffetz resigned. He was reelected in 2018, 2020, and 2022.

Early life
John Curtis was born May 10, 1960, in Ogden, Utah. His parents were Jesse Duckworth "Dee" Curtis (1927–2015) and Hazel Dawn Curtis (née Ream, 1925–2016). They married in 1955.

Curtis attended high school at Skyline High School, where he met his wife, Sue Snarr. He graduated from Brigham Young University with a degree in business management. He worked for OC Tanner and the Citizen Watch Company before taking a position as the COO of a Provo-based company, Action Target, in 2000.

Curtis ran for the Utah State Senate in 2000 as a Democrat against Curt Bramble, losing 33% to 66%. From 2002 to 2003, he served as vice chairman and chairman of the Utah County Democratic Party.

Mayor of Provo
Curtis was elected mayor of Provo in 2009, defeating former legislator Stephen Clark with 53% of the vote on a platform of safety, prosperity, and unity. In the office, he focused on economic development, revitalization of Downtown Provo, and getting a beach at Utah Lake. He launched clean air and recreation initiatives, preserved Rock Canyon, and launched a blog widely read by residents. He also assisted with the purchase of iProvo, Provo City's existing fiber internet network, by Google Fiber.

Curtis was reelected in 2013 with 86% of the vote. In November 2016, he announced he would not seek reelection to a third term.

During his last years in office, he averaged an approval rating of 93%.

Awards 
 Community Hero Award (Silicon Slopes, 2017)
 Civic Innovator of the Year Award (UVU, Office of New Urban Mechanics, 2017)
 Outstanding Citizen Award (BYU, Office of Civic Engagement Leadership, 2017)
 2017 Freedom Festival Grand Marshal
 Person of the Year (Utah Clean Air, 2017)
 Person of the Year Award (Utah Valley Magazine, 2017)
 Top Elected Official on Social Media (Government Social Media, 2015)
 The Star Award (SCERA Center for the Arts, 2015)

U.S. House of Representatives

Elections

2017 special 

On May 25, 2017, Curtis announced his candidacy for that year's special election in Utah's 3rd congressional district to replace Jason Chaffetz, who resigned on June 30. On August 15, Curtis won the Republican nomination over Christopher Herrod and Tanner Ainge. On November 7, he won the general election over Democratic nominee Kathie Allen.

Tenure
Curtis was sworn into office on November 13, 2017. Since being elected to Congress, he has held more than 100 town hall meetings, including a "walking town hall" to the top of Mount Timpanogos.

On October 16, 2019, Utah Policy reported Curtis had the second-highest approval rating among Utah's four U.S. Representatives. According to the Utah Policy and Y2 Analytics poll, 45% of 3rd Congressional District registered voters approved of his performance.

On December 18, 2019, Curtis voted against both articles of impeachment against Trump. Of the 195 Republicans who voted, all voted against both impeachment articles.

On May 19, 2021, Curtis and 34 other Republicans voted to establish a commission to investigate the events of January 6 modeled after the 9/11 Commission. Curtis did not vote to establish the Select Committee to investigate the events of January 6 that received only two Republican votes in the House.

In 2021, Curtis co-sponsored the Fairness for All Act, the Republican alternative to the Equality Act. The bill would prohibit discrimination based on sex, sexual orientation, and gender identity, and protect the free exercise of religion.

On July 19, 2022, Curtis and 46 other Republican Representatives voted for the Respect for Marriage Act, which would codify the right to same-sex marriage in federal law.

Conservative Climate Caucus 
On June 28, 2021, Curtis announced the new Conservative Climate Caucus in a press conference at the Capitol. He serves as chairman and leads the caucus's 73 members, including representatives from every committee with jurisdiction over climate policy and various ranking members. The caucus's purpose is to educate Republican House members on conservative climate solutions that align with Republican principles. Curtis said, "Without Republicans engaging in this debate, we will not make the progress we need to make as a country. Any significant accomplishment in the United States has been bipartisan. The ideas that Republicans bring to the table are essential to meeting the goals that we all have for a better environment."

Sponsored legislation 
Bears Ears National Monument
On December 4, 2017, Curtis and fellow Utah representatives Rob Bishop, Chris Stewart and Mia Love introduced a bill to codify the Trump administration's reduction of Bears Ears National Monument by creating two new national monuments in the remaining areas Trump defined.

On January 9, 2018, members of the Tribes of the Bears Ears Inter-Tribal Coalition testified against the bill, including Shaun Chapoose, a member of the Ute Indian Tribe and Utah Business Committee.

SPEED Act
On June 13, 2018, Curtis introduced H.R. 6088, the "Streamlining Permitting Efficiencies in Energy Development Act" or "SPEED Act". The legislation proposes streamlining the oil and gas permitting process by allowing Bureau of Land Management to expedite approval for drilling activities that pose little or no environmental harm. The bill would have amended the Mineral Leasing Act to establish procedures where an operator may conduct drilling and production activities on available Federal land and Non-Federal land. Community members criticized Curtis over this sponsorship, claiming it would omit the required environmental impact analysis and allow drilling on land without notifying the public or providing an opportunity to comment.

Public-Private Partnership Advisory Council to End Human Trafficking Act
On December 12, 2018, Curtis introduced H.R. 7271, the "Public-Private Partnership Advisory Council to End Human Trafficking Act", the companion bill to Senator Orrin Hatch's legislation. The bill creates a Public-Private Advisory Council to provide a direct line to federal government agencies to streamline bureaucratic hurdles while empowering nonprofits and nongovernmental organizations in fighting human trafficking.

Government Shutdown Prevention Act
On January 16, 2019, Curtis and Lloyd Smucker introduced the Government Shutdown Prevention Act. The legislation aims to end political game-playing and fix Congress's dysfunctional budget process. If passed, it would automatically continue government funding through a continuing resolution. The bill would implement a five percent spending penalty when the continuing resolution begins. Federal spending would be reduced by two percent 60 days after the first day of the fiscal year and by an additional two percent each subsequent 60-day period. Curtis said, "The American people expect Congress to do its most basic job: pass a budget and fund the government. If we can't, then we shouldn't get paid." Curtis asked the Clerk of the House to withhold his pay until Congress fully funded the government. He believes that Republicans and Democrats should be held accountable to find common ground to solve funding impasses.

Transparency in Student Lending Act
On January 28, 2019, Curtis introduced the Transparency in Student Lending Act, legislation to improve the information provided to students and families taking on federal loans to finance higher education. The bill would require the disclosure of the annual percentage rate (APR) for federal student loans before disbursement. The APR assists borrowers by showing the true cost of a loan, helping students and their families make more informed financial decisions. Curtis said, "As the primary provider of the vast majority of student loans and education financing options, the federal government should provide a transparent and full accounting of associated costs and fees for borrowers. I represent the youngest Congressional district in the country with an average age of 26 years old; these students must be equipped to make the right decisions for their families and their futures."

Bicameral Congressional Trade Authority Act
On February 1, 2019, Curtis introduced the Bicameral Congressional Trade Authority Act of 2019. The bill would require the president to submit to Congress any proposal to adjust imports in the interest of national security under Section 232 of the Trade Expansion Act of 1962. A companion bill was introduced in the Senate. Curtis said the trade war was mostly hurting small businesses and that he had "heard for months almost daily, if not daily, weekly from businesses it's hurting and unfortunately it's having a disproportionate impact on small businesses. And 99 percent of the businesses in my district are small businesses. We need to quickly resolve this because they're the ones who are least able to sustain it. This bill ensures their priorities will be incorporated."

Natural Resources Management Act
On March 11, 2019, the Natural Resources Management Act, considered a highly significant public lands bill, was signed into law. The act consists of about 100 bills joined into one, including two proposals carried by Curtis.

On February 26, 2019, Curtis spoke on the House floor, advocating for the Natural Resources Management Act. "The Emery County bill has been a locally driven effort and will bring long-term certainty to the area through various designations and expanding Goblin Valley State Park for better management," he said. "It will also generate millions of dollars to help Utah's schoolchildren through school trust land exchanges." The House passed the largest public lands bill in decades, establishing hundreds of thousands of acres of wilderness across the nation, including a vast swath of Utah, and allowing the creation of a new national monument.

The Natural Resources Management Act is a public lands package that comprises over 100 individual bills, including ten locally driven pieces of legislation that directly impact Utah.

In May 2018, Curtis drew criticism after introducing the Emery County Public Land Management Act of 2018. Opponents argued the bill omitted approximately 900,000 acres of wilderness in its proposed designation, including Labyrinth Canyon and Muddy Creek. Conservation groups accused Curtis of removing the existing Wilderness Study Area protection to facilitate coal mining. One of these opponents, the Southern Utah Wilderness Alliance (SUWA), ultimately supported the legislation.

On June 25, 2018, it was announced that the congressional subcommittee overstated environmental groups' support for the Emery County Public Land Management Act of 2018. An aide to Curtis stated there was a mix-up and the record would be corrected. Seven environmental organizations were named as supporting the legislation in a June 18 background memo ahead of a hearing before the Federal Lands Subcommittee, but just one of the groups named said it was accurate to call it a supporter.

Fairness for High-Skilled Immigrants Act
On July 10, 2019, Curtis spoke on the House floor to advocate for HR 1044, the Fairness for High-Skilled Immigrants Act of 2019, legislation he co-authored to eliminate the per-country caps for employment-based visas and shift to a first-come, first-served process. Curtis, whose district is home to several high-tech businesses, said he regularly hears from leaders of those companies that they "do not have enough high-skilled workers … and demand continues to outstrip supply." He added, "this legislation will create a first-come, first-serve system providing certainty to workers and families and enabling US companies to flourish and compete in a global economy as they hire the brightest people to create products, services, and jobs—regardless of where they were born." After he spoke, the legislation passed the House, 365-65.

House Foreign Affairs Committee
Curtis participated in a panel discussion at a U.S. Global Leadership Coalition forum on April 5, 2019, highlighting the importance of American diplomacy and foreign aid in bolstering U.S. national security and creating economic opportunities for Utah businesses. "As a member of the House Foreign Affairs Committee, I am committed to supporting the vital U.S. government programs that protect our nation's interests abroad", he said. "Our global ties help to open new markets for U.S. businesses and create jobs for Americans, while U.S. diplomats and development workers overseas are preventing conflicts and wiping out diseases before they reach our borders."

House Natural Resources Committee
On February 13, 2019, Curtis invited the National Parks, Forests, and Public Lands Subcommittee to join the Clean Air Challenge and find common ground to address Utah's and the country's environmental issues. Curtis then introduced the Provo Clean Air Toolkit, which contains strategies Utahns can use to improve the quality on personal levels and businesses can use on larger scales. He then asked the subcommittee to take the "Provo Clean Air Challenge Pledge" with him and the rest of Utah to pass along the clean-air initiative.

Committee assignments 
United States House Committee on Energy and Commerce
Subcommittee on Health
Subcommittee on Communications & Technology
Subcommittee on Environment & Climate Change

Caucus memberships 
 Republican Governance Group  
 Republican Main Street Partnership 
 Congressional Western Caucus
Ski and Snowboard Caucus
Republican Study Committee
Congressional Dietary Supplement Caucus
Problem Solvers Caucus
Conservative Climate Caucus (chair)

Personal and professional life 
Curtis is a member of the Church of Jesus Christ of Latter-day Saints and served a two-year mission in Taiwan. He and his wife Sue have six children and fourteen grandchildren.

As a public figure, he has gained recognition for his expansive collection of socks.

Controversies 
On March 20, 2018, five women filed a lawsuit claiming the city of Provo and Curtis (as mayor) failed to take action to protect them from alleged sexual harassment and assault by former police chief John King, despite allegations of misconduct in 2015 and 2016. Plaintiffs accused King of a broad range of sexual misconduct, including staring at their breasts, making inappropriate comments, uninvited touching, groping and, in one case, rape.

City Council members told the Deseret News that they held a closed-door meeting about King's conduct in late 2015 or early 2016. The lawsuit alleged that Curtis chilled reporting by telling police department supervisors in the fall of 2014 that "he did not want to receive any more complaints about Chief King." The complaint read, "Chief King was going to remain chief of the department as long as Curtis was in office, and there was nothing the supervisors could do about it". Curtis said the meeting was mischaracterized, that he had called the meeting to discuss a new, unpopular "beat program" that King had implemented in the police department. He said the department was also concerned that King would not stay in Provo long because his wife did not move to Utah with him. "That was absolutely all", Curtis said. "Never, under any circumstances, would I infer that they were expected to follow him if anything was not appropriate, let alone sexual harassment." Councilman Gary Winterton confirmed the council had such a discussion about King, with the chief present, but he said he could not say much about the meeting because it was a closed session. Winterton said he could not say what type of administrative action, if any, was taken. The lawsuit stated the meeting did not result in any discipline of King.

In March 2017, King resigned after the rape allegation at Curtis's request, even though Salt Lake County District Attorney Sim Gill had declined to bring charges. In an email obtained by the Deseret News through a records request, King thanked Curtis for his support: "You did your best to protect me at the press conference", he wrote. "I am deeply sorry for putting you in this terrible position."

On March 23, 2018, Curtis clarified that as Provo's mayor, he heard three, not just two, complaints of inappropriate sexual conduct against King. The first time, Curtis said, he warned King that even if his alleged actions had been misinterpreted, King shouldn't put himself in positions where his actions could be misinterpreted. The second time, he ordered King to retake sexual harassment training and reiterated that he should not go past a certain point while visiting women at the department's dispatch center. The third time, after a student volunteer accused King of rape in early 2017, Curtis asked for King's resignation.

In response, Curtis said, "One of the things I'm learning is what women expect is more than checking the boxes legally. They need a lot of emotional support and understanding. And we don't talk a lot about that portion of what do you do when these things happen. So, in a way, if you think about this, I'm seeing, like, 'OK, my primary responsibility is to get this into the right hands.' I read her comments about how what I did made her feel, and it was clear to me that she expected more from me than just getting it into the right hands. Lesson learned."

Electoral history

References

External links

Curtis's official U.S. House website
Curtis's campaign website
 
 

1960 births
20th-century Mormon missionaries
21st-century American politicians
American Mormon missionaries in Taiwan
Brigham Young University alumni
Latter Day Saints from Utah
Living people
Mayors of Provo, Utah
Republican Party members of the United States House of Representatives from Utah
Utah Democrats
American Latter Day Saints